Chris Johns may refer to:

 Chris Johns (darts player) (born 1958), Welsh darts player
 Chris Johns (photographer) (born 1951), American photographer
 Chris Johns (rugby league) (born 1964), Australian rugby league footballer

See also
Chris John (disambiguation)